Nairn may refer to:

Geography
 Nairn, Middlesex County, Ontario, Canada, a community
 Nairn River, Chatham Islands, New Zealand
 Nairn, Scotland, a town
 River Nairn, Scotland
 County of Nairn, Scotland, a former county abolished in 1975, and a district of the Highland Region until 1996

People
 Nairn (surname)
 Nairn MacEwan (1941–2018), Scottish rugby player and coach
 Nairn Wilson (born 1950), Scottish dentist and academic

Other uses
 Nairn baronets, two titles in the Baronetage of the United Kingdom
 Nairn Transport Company, a motor transport company that operated a trans-desert route from Beirut, Haifa and Damascus to Baghdad from 1923
 Nairn Street, Fremantle, Western Australia
 Nairn Academy, a secondary school in Nairn, Scotland